Pam Whytcross (born 25 November 1953) is a former professional tennis player from Australia. In a nine-year professional career beginning in 1977, Whytcross won 3 doubles titles and was a losing finalist with Naoko Satō at the 1978 Australian Open. In singles, Whytcross' best Grand Slam results were at Melbourne and Roland Garros in 1977, where she reached the third round. Whytcross reached a career-high singles ranking of 150 and number 141 in doubles.

Career
Although Whytcross did not turn professional until 1977, she began competing in tournaments in 1973 and played in her first doubles final in Sydney in January 1974. Her best achievement was reaching the final of the Australian Open in 1978 with partner Naoko Satō, but they lost to Betsy Nagelsen and Renáta Tomanová. In singles competition at the Grand Slams, she reached the third round of the French Open in 1977 and at Wimbledon in 1978 Wimbledon Championships.

Whytcross won her first doubles title at the Head Cup in Kitzbühel, Austria in July 1983. Successive titles followed in October at two tournaments in Tokyo: the Japan Open and the Borden Classic. She competed in the doubles final in Mahwah, New Jersey in 1978 but she lost with partner Barbara Potter.

She retired in 1986 at the age of 33.

Post-tennis career
In 1998, Whytcross became involved with mentoring Australian player Jelena Dokić as part of the Women's Tennis Association (WTA) mentoring scheme. She held the responsibility for two years, then she was appointed the tennis competition manager at the 2000 Summer Olympics. Following the conclusion of the games, she took up a role as a WTA Tour supervisor.

Grand Slam finals

Doubles: 1 (0–1)

WTA finals

Doubles (3 wins, 3 losses)

References

External links
 
 

1953 births
Australian female tennis players
Living people
Place of birth missing (living people)